Grade 3 may refer to:

Grade 3, the third year of primary education.
Grade 3 horse races, the third tier in worldwide horse racing.